The following lists events that happened during 2014 in Cape Verde.

Incumbents
Prime Minister: José Maria Neves
President: Jorge Carlos Fonseca

Events
Oceanpress, newspaper of the island of Sal published its first edition
September 22: the 6th José Maria Neves Cabinet began
November 23: Start of the 2014–15 eruption of Fogo

Sports

CS Mindelense won the Cape Verdean Football Championship

References

 
Years of the 21st century in Cape Verde
2010s in Cape Verde
Cape Verde
Cape Verde